The 1911 Spring Hill Badgers football team represented the Spring Hill College as an independent during the 1911 college football season. The team was coached by E. G. Maxon. The team played its games at Campus Athletic Field, later called Maxon Field. The season was an unfortunate one. The team "outplayed Marion, but lost the game out of sheer bad luck. Southern University won only by Spring Hill's failure to kick goal.

Schedule

References

Spring Hill
Spring Hill Badgers football seasons
Spring Hill Badgers football